Boten is a town in Laos.

Boten may also refer to:

 Boten railway station, railway station in Boten

See also 
 Boten–Vientiane railway
 
 Botene district, district of Sainyabuli province, Laos
 Boteni, commune in Argeș County, Muntenia, Romania
 Botenlauben Castle, ruined castle in Reiterswiesen